A thunderhead is a cumulonimbus cloud seen during a thunderstorm.

Thunderhead may also refer to:

 Thunderhead (horse), a racehorse
 Thunderhead (Preston and Child novel)
 Thunderhead (Shusterman novel)
 Thunderhead (roller coaster) at Dollywood theme park 
 Thunderhead, Son of Flicka, a 1945 film
 Thunderhead Mountain in the Great Smoky Mountains
 Thunderhead, a character in the Young Heroes in Love comic book series
 "Thunderhead (I Just Wanted A Little Rain)", a song on the album Well... by Katey Sagal
 "Thunderhead", a song by Phish from their album Round Room
 "Thunderhead", a song by Overkill from their album Bloodletting
 "Thunderhead", a song by W.A.S.P. from their album The Headless Children
 Thunderhead Raceway, a fictional raceway in the film Speed Racer